Nebušice is a district of Prague 6. It is situated northwest of the city center. It is connected with the city center by four bus lines, from bus station Bořislavka 161 and 312.

History 
Nebušice was connected to Prague in 1968, before then it was a village.

References

External links 

 Webpage of Nebušice (Czech language)

Districts of Prague